B. bidentata may refer to:

 Bauhinia bidentata, a flowering plant
 Bayadera bidentata, a large damselfly
 Bertula bidentata, a Taiwanese moth